Roberto Juarroz (5 October 1925 – 31 March 1995) was an Argentine poet famous for his "Poesía vertical" (Vertical poetry).

Biography 
Born in Coronel Dorrego, Roberto Juarroz published 14 volumes of poetry in all, numbered successively 1 to 14, under the general title "Poesía vertical", the first appearing in 1958 and the final one posthumously in 1997. A fifteenth volume was edited by his wife, the poet and critic Laura Cerrato, and published after his death.  W.S. Merwin published a bilingual selection of Juarroz' poems in 1977 (Kayak Books) which was re-issued in an enlarged edition in 1987 (North Point Press), both volumes entitled Vertical Poetry.  In 1992 Mary Crow published her translations of the later work as Vertical Poetry: Recent Poems (White Pine Press), which won a Colorado Book Award. In 2011 Crow's translations of a selection of Juarroz' final poems will appear as Vertical Poetry:  Last Poems (White Pine Press). He died in 1995 in  Temperley.

Literary style and critical reception 
The poetry of Juarroz is spare and sometimes cryptic, with lines such as "busco las espaldas de Dios" ("I seek the back of God"). Octavio Paz wrote: "Each poem of Roberto Juarroz is a surprising verbal crystallisation: language reduced to a bead of light. A major poet of absolute moments." For Julio Cortázar, his poems included both "the most elevated, and most profound, written in Spanish in recent years". Andreas Dorschel calls the "philosophical poetry" of Roberto Juarroz "transparent and dark at the same time", and praises "its lightness and its metaphysical wit".

Example

English translations
Juarroz, Roberto. Vertical Poetry, trans. by W.S. Merwin. Kayak Books, 1977. .
Enlarged edition, North Point Books, 1988 .
Juarroz, Roberto. Vertical Poetry: Recent Poems, trans. by Mary Crow.  White Pine Press, 1992.  .
Juarroz, Roberto.  Vertical Poetry: Last Poems, trans. by Mary Crow.  White Pine Press, 2011.

Translations of individual poems have appeared in many anthologies, including "The Vintage Book of World Poetry" and "The Poetry of Our World: An International Anthology of Contemporary Poetry," and literary magazines, including Salamander, Literal: Latin American Voices, Seneca Review, Hawai'i Review, and Visions International.

References

External links 
 Juarroz's poetry in Spanish
Two poems by Roberto Juarroz

1925 births
1995 deaths
People from Buenos Aires Province
Argentine male poets
Argentine translators
20th-century Argentine poets
20th-century Argentine male writers
20th-century translators